Deokali is an industrial area in Ayodhya city in the Indian state of Uttar Pradesh and is a subpost office of Ayodhya.

Demographics
As of the 2011 India census, Deokali had a population of 25,790. Males constituted 51% of the population and females 49%. Deokali had an average literacy rate of 62%, higher than the national average of 59.5%; male literacy was 71%, and female literacy was 52%. 17% of the population was under six years of age.

References

Industrial Area in Faizabad
Tourist attractions in Faizabad district